Southern New Hampshire Health is a system of hospitals and medical centers throughout the southern part of the state of New Hampshire in the United States. It is anchored by the Southern New Hampshire Medical Center (SNHMC), located in Nashua. The hospital was founded in 1893 as Nashua Memorial Hospital and is now a 188-bed regional medical facility that serves an estimated 100,000 patients a year in the southern New Hampshire region. SNHMC has over 500 primary and specialty care providers. SNHMC offers a full suite of health services, including a trauma center, newborn intensive care unit and distinguished programs in endoscopy, orthopedic surgery, gastroenterology, cardiology and neurosurgery.

Clinical affiliation with Massachusetts General Hospital 
Southern New Hampshire Health System is a clinical affiliate of Massachusetts General Hospital (MGH).

Magnet designation 
In 2006, SNHMC was designated as a Magnet hospital in recognition of nursing excellence, one of 386 hospitals worldwide that have such a designation.  SNHMC has also been recognized by the American College of Surgeons National Surgical Quality Improvement Program.

Additional partnerships 
Foundation Medical Partners (FMP) is an employed medical group of nearly 300 health care providers, under the same parent organization of Southern New Hampshire Health System. In 2018, SNHHS joined with Elliot Health System based in Manchester, New Hampshire, to create a regional health system SolutionHealth.

History 
The facility was founded in 1893 as Nashua Memorial Hospital, an eight-bed emergency hospital. For 62 years, the hospital ran the Nashua Memorial Hospital School of Nursing, one of the only sources of professional training in the area for nurses. In 1979, Nashua Memorial Hospital opened the Surgical Short Stay Unit for same-day surgeries, and the hospital continued to expand and improve over the following decades. A $12 million construction project broke ground in July 2004 to expand emergency and cardiology services.

References

External links 
 

Hospitals in Hillsborough County, New Hampshire
Hospital buildings completed in 1893
Buildings and structures in Nashua, New Hampshire
Hospitals established in 1893
1893 establishments in New Hampshire